St George's Castle, or variants, may refer to:

 Castello di San Giorgio, Mantua (Castle of St. George), part of the Ducal palace, Mantua, Lombardy, Italy
 Saint George's Castle, Lisbon, Portugal
 Castle of San Jorge, Seville, Spain
 Castle of Saint George, Cephalonia, Greece
 Siege of the Castle of Saint George
 St. George's Castle, Preveza, Greece
 Elmina Castle, the Castelo de São Jorge da Mina (Castle of St. George of the Mine), Elmina, Ghana

See also
 Saint George (disambiguation)
Fort St. George, India
St George's Chapel, Windsor Castle